The 2012–13 Belgian Elite League was the 72nd season of the Belgian Elite League, the top flight men's rugby union league in Belgium. Kituro RC won the championship playoffs, while Dendermondse RC were relegated. In total 8 teams participated.

Season table

{| class="wikitable" width="450px" style="float:left; font-size:95%; margin-left:15px;"
| colspan="2"  style="text-align:center; background:#fff;" cellpadding="0" cellspacing="0"|Key to colours
|-
| style="background: #3fff00;" |     
| Champions
|-
| style="background:#ccf;"|     
|Participants in Championship Playoffs
|-
| style="background: #ff79B4;" |     
|Bottom team is relegated to Division 2.
|}

Championship playoffs

External links

2008–09
2008–09  in European rugby union leagues